Quentin Gause (born October 30, 1992) is an American football linebacker who is a free agent. He played college football at Rutgers and signed with the Philadelphia Eagles as an undrafted free agent in 2016.

Professional career

Philadelphia Eagles
Gause signed with the Philadelphia Eagles as an undrafted free agent on May 5, 2016. He was released by the Eagles on September 3, 2016 during final roster cuts. He was signed to the practice squad on September 5, 2016, but was released later that day.

New England Patriots
On September 7, 2016, Gause was signed to the Patriots' practice squad. He was released by the Patriots on October 5, 2016.

Denver Broncos
On October 18, 2016, Gause was signed to the Broncos' practice squad. He was promoted to the active roster on December 10, 2016.

On September 2, 2017, Gause was waived by the Broncos.

Memphis Express
In 2019, Gause joined the Memphis Express of the Alliance of American Football (AAF). The league ceased operations in April 2019.

Los Angeles Wildcats
In October 2019, Gause was selected by the Los Angeles Wildcats as part of the 2020 XFL Draft's open phase. He had his contract terminated when the league suspended operations on April 10, 2020.

Massachusetts Pirates
On August 21, 2021, Gause signed with the Massachusetts Pirates of the Indoor Football League, where he would win the 2021 United Bowl championship. On January 17, 2022, Gause was released by the Pirates.

References

External links
Rutgers Scarlet Knights bio

Living people
1992 births
Sportspeople from Rochester, New York
Players of American football from New York (state)
American football linebackers
Rutgers Scarlet Knights football players
Philadelphia Eagles players
New England Patriots players
Denver Broncos players
Ottawa Redblacks players
Canadian football linebackers
Memphis Express (American football) players
Los Angeles Wildcats (XFL) players
Massachusetts Pirates players